Dave Matthews and Tim Reynolds or Dave and Tim is a musical act composed of Dave Matthews, member of Dave Matthews Band, and Tim Reynolds, member of TR3 and Dave Matthews Band.

History 

Matthews and Reynolds met in Charlottesville, Virginia, while Matthews was a bartender at Miller's.  Reynolds encouraged Matthews' musical growth. Matthews wanted to join Reynolds' band TR3, but Reynolds told him to form his own band.

Matthews went on to form Dave Matthews Band (DMB). Reynolds has occasionally joined the band in the studio, as on the albums Under the Table and Dreaming, Crash, Before These Crowded Streets, Big Whiskey and the GrooGrux King, Away from the World, Come Tomorrow and as a touring member of DMB.

By 1993, as a side project, Matthews and Reynolds performed several acoustic set shows, first on April 22, 1993.

From this point onward, they always played acoustic, and they always played every year together (with the exception of the following years : 2000, 2001 and 2002), whether as Dave and Tim, Matthews guesting with TR3, Reynolds guesting with Dave Matthews Band, or Matthews and Reynolds playing in the band Dave Matthews and Friends.

Discography

Live albums

DMBLive

Live Trax

Extended plays

Bonus Discs

See also 
Dave Matthews
Tim Reynolds
Dave Matthews Band
TR3
Dave Matthews and Friends
Dave Matthews Band tours - includes tours of Dave Matthews and Tim Reynolds

References 

Rock music duos
Dave Matthews
Musical groups established in 1993